Penfold Park is a public park managed by the Hong Kong Jockey Club in Sha Tin, Hong Kong. It is named after Major-General Bernard Penfold, the first general manager of the Jockey Club who was in office from 1972 to 1979.

The park is located in the centre (within the track) of the Sha Tin Racecourse with a gross area of over 20 acres. It features green areas, as well as pools used by various waterbirds. People around the area often go there to have a walk. There are many painted horse statues and artworks. It is closed during horse racing days and Mondays.

History
The park was briefly called Infield Park at opening on 11 May 1979. The chairman of the Jockey Club Board of Stewards, during the Stewards' annual general meeting on 17 September that year, announced that the park would be named in honour of Major-General Bernard Penfold. The chairman explained that the Stewards "considered the beautifying of the in-field with shrubs and trees to be a characteristic example of General Penfold's many achievements". General Penfold, the manager of the Jockey Club who presided over construction of the park, was slated to retire the following year after seven seasons as general manager.

During the years after SARS, there were a few slight bouts of bird flu, and the man-made lakes had been closed a few times to reduce the chance of visitors contracting the diseases. The Hong Kong Jockey Club had announced that Penfold Park would be closed from the end of July 2007 to April 2008 for the construction of training facilities for the 2008 Olympic equestrian events. On 17 January 2009, the park was reopened for the public.

Features

Opening hours
On 22 September 2015, The Hong Kong Jockey Club announced that Penfold Park would be open year-round and with extended opening hours.

Transportation
  – Fo Tan station or Racecourse station

See also

 List of urban public parks and gardens of Hong Kong

References

External links
 "Review of Egretries in Hong Kong", in Hong Kong Biodiversity, Issue No. 14 March 2007, pp. 1-6.

Urban public parks and gardens in Hong Kong
Sha Tin District